Agricultural microbiology is a branch of microbiology dealing with plant-associated microbes and plant and animal diseases. It also deals with the microbiology of soil fertility, such as microbial degradation of organic matter and soil nutrient transformations.

Soil microorganisms

Importance of soil microorganisms 
 Involved in nutrient transformation process
 Decomposition of resistant components of plant and animal tissue
 Role in microbial antagonism

Microorganisms as biofertilizers 
Biofertilizers are seen as promising, sustainable alternatives to harmful chemical fertilizers due to their ability to increase yield and soil fertility through enhancing crop immunity and development. When applied to the soil, plant, or seed these biofertilizers colonize the rhizosphere or interior of the plant root. Once the microbial community is established, these microorganisms can help to solubilize and break down essential nutrients in the environment which would otherwise be unavailable or difficult for the crop to incorporate into biomass.

Nitrogen 
Nitrogen is an essential element needed for the creation of biomass and is usually seen as a limiting nutrient in agricultural systems. Though abundant in the atmosphere, the atmospheric form of nitrogen cannot be utilized by plants and must be transformed into a form that can be taken up directly by the plants; this problem is solved by biological nitrogen fixers. Nitrogen fixing bacteria, also known as diazotrophs, can be broken down into three groups: free-living (ex. Azotobacter, Anabaena, and Clostridium) , symbiotic (ex. Rhizobium and Trichodesmium) and associative symbiotic (ex. Azospirillum). These organisms have the ability to fix atmospheric nitrogen to bioavailable forms that can be taken up by plants and incorporated into biomass. An important nitrogen fixing symbiosis is that between Rhizobium and leguminous plants. Rhizobium have been shown to contribute upwards of 300 kg N/ha/year in different leguminous plants, and their application to agricultural crops has been shown to increase crop height, seed germination, and nitrogen content within the plant. The utilization of nitrogen fixing bacteria in agriculture could help reduce the reliance on man-made nitrogen fertilizers that are synthesized via the Haber-Bosch process.

Phosphorus 
Phosphorus can be made available to plants via solubilization or mobilization by bacteria or fungi. Under most soil conditions, phosphorus is the least mobile nutrient in the environment and therefore must be converted to solubilized forms in order to be available for plant uptake. Phosphate solubilization is the process by which organic acids are secreted into the environment, this lowers the pH and dissolves phosphate bonds therefore leaving the phosphate solubilized. Phosphate-solubilizing bacteria (PBS) (ex. Bacillus subtilis and Bacillus circulans) are responsible for upwards of 50% of microbial phosphate solubilization. In addition to the solubilized phosphate, PBS can also provide trace elements such as iron and zinc which further enhance plant growth. Fungi (ex. Aspergillus awamori and Penicillium spp.) also perform this process, however their contribution is less than 1% of all activity. A 2019 study showed that when crops were inoculated with Aspergillus niger , there was a significant increase fruit size and yield compared with non-inoculated crops; when the crop was co-inoculated with A. niger and the nitrogen fixing bacteria Azobacter, the crop performance was better than with inoculation using only one of the biofertilizer and the crops that were not inoculated at all. Phosphorus mobilization is the process of transferring phosphorus to the root from the soil; this process is carried out via mycorrhiza (ex. Arbuscular mycorrhiza) . Arbuscular mycorrhiza mobilize phosphate by penetrating and increasing the surface area of the roots which helps to mobilize phosphorus into the plant. Phosphate solubilizing and mobilizing microorganisms can contribute upwards of 30–50 kg P2O5/ha which, in turn, has the potential to increase crop yield by 10–20%.

Example 
 DAP
 UREA 
 SUPER PHOSPHATE

See also
Veterinary medicine

References

Further reading

Agriculture
Microbiology